Joseph Friedenson (1922–2013) was a Holocaust survivor, Holocaust historian, Yiddish writer, lecturer, and editor of .

Friedenson was born in Łódź, Poland in April, 1922, to Rabbi Eliezer Gershon, an activist for Agudath Israel of Poland and the editor of the Beth Jacob Journal, curricula used throughout the Bais Yaakov movement in pre-World War II Europe.

When World War II broke out, Friedenson's family fled to Warsaw, eventually becoming prisoners of the Warsaw Ghetto where Joseph married Gittel Leah Zilberman of Szydłowiec. They were smuggled out of the ghetto and subsequently ended up spending several years in the slave labor camp of Starchowicz, before it was liquidated.

The family arrived at Auschwitz in July 1944. Joseph endured death marches, confinement in Ohrdruf and several other concentration camps, and was finally liberated from Buchenwald in April, 1945, by the United States Army.

Mrs. Friedenson remained in Auschwitz and was liberated by the Russian Army in early 1945. The couple was reunited several months later, spent several years in post-war Germany working to help other survivors rebuild their lives, and immigrated to the United States in 1951 where Joseph joined Agudath Israel of America.

He authored several books on the Holocaust, published by ArtScroll.

He died on February 23, 2013.

His son-in-law is Rabbi Yosef Chaim Golding, who authored his biography, Faith amid the Flames, an ArtScroll publication.

References

External links 

My Victory over the Nazis by Joseph Friedenson
The Day of My Victory by Joseph Friedenson

1922 births
2013 deaths
Auschwitz concentration camp survivors
Buchenwald concentration camp survivors
Polish editors
Haredi writers
Historians of the Holocaust
Jewish historians
Jewish non-fiction writers
Jewish religious writers
Writers from Łódź
People from Łódź Voivodeship (1919–1939)
Polish Haredim
Warsaw Ghetto inmates
Yiddish-language writers
Polish emigrants to the United States
American Haredim
American people of Polish-Jewish descent
Polish expatriates in Germany